A repair ship is a naval auxiliary ship designed to provide maintenance support to warships. Repair ships provide similar services to destroyer, submarine and seaplane tenders or depot ships, but may offer a broader range of repair capability including equipment and personnel for repair of more significant machinery failures or battle damage.

United States Navy

The United States Navy became aware of the need for repair ships to maintain Asiatic Fleet ships stationed in the Philippines.

Repair ships
Repair ships:

Internal combustion engine repair ship
Internal combustion engine repair ships specializing in the maintenance and repair of gasoline engines and diesel engines. Common work was on PT boats, submarines, and many types of landing craft at US Naval Advance Bases. Internal combustion engine repair ship worked on types of ships and boats. 
On class are the Luzon-class repair ships, named after Islands of the Philippines:
 USS Oglala (ARG-1)
 USS Luzon (ARG-2)
 USS Mindanao (ARG-3)
 USS Tutuila (ARG-4)
 USS Oahu (ARG-5)
 USS Cebu (ARG-6)
 USS Culebra Island (ARG-7)
 USS Leyte (ARG-8), renamed USS Maui
 USS Mona Island (ARG-9)
 USS Palawan (ARG-10)
 USS Samar (ARG-11)
 USS Dumaran (ARG-14)
 USS Masbate (ARG-15), later ARV-2, aircraft repair ship 
 USS Kermit Roosevelt (ARG-16)
 USS Hooper Island (ARG-17)
 USS Beaver (ARG-19), ex-AS-5
 USS Otus (ARG-20), ex-AS-20

Basilan class of Internal combustion engine repair ship
 USS Basilan (ARG-12), ex-AG-68
 USS Burias (ARG-13), ex-AG-69

Heavy-hull Repair Ship (ARH)
 USS Jason (ARH-1), later AR-8

Landing Craft Repair Ship
Landing Craft Repair Ships (ARL), used to repair Landing craft, like the Achelous-class repair ship:
Thousands of landing craft were built for World War II these ships supported the Landing craft fleet.

 USS Achelous (ARL-1), ex-LST-10
 USS Amycus (ARL-2), ex-LST-489
 USS Agenor (ARL-3), ex-LST-490
 USS Adonis (ARL-4), ex-LST-83
 USS ARL-5, ex-LST-81
 USS ARL-6, ex-LST-82
 USS Atlas (ARL-7), ex-LST-231
 USS Egeria (ARL-8), ex-LST-136
 USS Endymion (ARL-9), ex-LST-513
 USS Coronis (ARL-10), ex-LST-1003
 USS Creon (ARL-11), ex-LST-1036
 USS Poseidon (ARL-12), ex-LST-1037
 USS Menelaus (ARL-13), ex-LST-971
 USS Minos (ARL-14), ex-LST-644
 USS Minotaur (ARL-15), ex-LST-645
 USS Myrmidon (ARL-16), ex-LST-948
 USS Numitor (ARL-17), ex-LST-954
 USS Pandemus (ARL-18), ex-LST-650
 USS Patroclus (ARL-19), ex-LST-955
 USS Pentheus (ARL-20), ex-LST-1115
 USS Proserpine (ARL-21), ex-LST-1116
 USS Romulus (ARL-22), ex-LST-961
 USS Satyr (ARL-23), ex-LST-852
 USS Sphinx (ARL-24), ex-LST-962
 USS ARL-25, canceled
 USS Stentor (ARL-26), ex-LST-858
 USS Tantalus (ARL-27), ex-LST-1117
 USS Typhon (ARL-28), ex-LST-1118
 USS Amphitrite (ARL-29), ex-LST-1124
 USS Askari (ARL-30), ex-LST-1131
 USS Bellerophon (ARL-31), ex-LST-1132
 USS Bellona (ARL-32), ex-LST-1136
 USS Chimaera (ARL-33), ex-LST-1137
 USS Daedalus (ARL-35), ex-LST-1143
 USS Gordius (ARL-36), ex-LST-1145
 USS Indra (ARL-37), ex-LST-1147
 USS Krishna (ARL-38), ex-LST-1149
 USS Quirinus (ARL-39), ex-LST-1151
 USS Remus (ARL-40), ex-LST-453
 USS Achilles (ARL-41), ex-LST-455
 USS Aeolus (ARL-42), conversion from LST-310 cancelled
 USS Cerberus (ARL-43), conversion from LST-316, cancelled
 USS Conus (ARL-44), conversion from LST-317 cancelled
 USS Feronia (ARL-45), conversion from LST-332 cancelled
 USS Chandra (ARL-46), conversion from LST-350 cancelled
 USS Minerva (ARL-47), conversion from LST-374 cancelled

United Kingdom

 was built in 1928 and remained the sole Royal Navy repair ship at the outbreak of World War II. The following ships were converted to meet wartime needs:
 
 HMS Alaunia (F15)
 
 
 RMS Ausonia
 HMS Deer Sound
 HMS Kelantan (F166)
 SS Ranpura
 HMS San Giorgio (formerly Italian cruiser San Giorgio)
 
 HMS Wayland (F137)
 HMS Westernland (F87)

Lend/Lease

These Xanthus-class repair ships were built to Royal Navy specifications by Bethlehem Fairfield Shipyard in 1944, but only the first two were temporarily loaned to the United Kingdom while the others were retained for use by the United States Navy:
 AR-17 became HMS Assistance (F173)
 AR-18 became HMS Diligence (F174)
  was intended to be HMS Hecla (F175)
  was intended to be HMS Dutiful (F176)
  was intended to be HMS Faithful (F177)

Japan

Japan found repair ships valuable for Pacific island bases. The pre-dreadnought battleship Asahi was modified and recommissioned as a repair ship in 1938. The 9,000-ton purpose-designed repair ship Akashi was launched in 1938 as the intended prototype for a class of five ships, but the remaining four ships were cancelled as other wartime shipbuilding projects assumed higher priority.

See also
Aircraft repair ship

Sources

Notes

Ship types